Tebello Nyokong  (born 20 October 1951) is a South African chemist and distinguished professor at Rhodes University, and a recipient of South Africa's Order of Mapungubwe. Nyokong's work has been published around 450 times including a patent. She was awarded the South African Chemical Institute Gold Medal in 2012, and named one of the Top 10 Most Influential Women in Science and Technology in Africa by IT News Africa. She is currently researching photo-dynamic therapy, an alternative cancer treatment method to chemotherapy. In 2007, she was one of the top three publishing scientists in South Africa, and in 2013 she was awarded the National Research Foundation's Lifetime Achievement Award.

Education

Nyokong was born in Lesotho but spent most of her youth in South Africa. Two years before her matric year she changed from arts studies to the sciences, developing an interest in chemistry. She received her Cambridge Overseas School Certificate in 1972.

Nyokong came from a poor background. She had to wear second-hand clothes and was barefoot. As a young girl she was sent to live with her grandparents in the mountains of Lesotho. She learnt about science by observing the wildlife whilst she worked as an eight-year-old child caring for sheep. Nyokong says that she would spend one day at school and then one day with the sheep as someone had to care for them. Nyokong says that one of her childhood ambitions was to own her own pair of shoes. When she started school she was steered away from science as she was told that it was too hard. It was only with two years to go that she changed direction and with perseverance completed the science course.

Nyokong earned her bachelor's degree in both chemistry and biology from the National University of Lesotho in 1977. She went on to earn her master's in chemistry from McMaster University in Ontario, Canada. In 1987, she received her Ph.D in chemistry from the University of Western Ontario. After earning her PhD, she received a Fulbright fellowship to continue her post-doctoral studies at the University of Notre Dame in the United States.

Career

After finishing her Fulbright fellowship in the United States, Nyokong returned to Lesotho, briefly as it turned out, to take a position at the University of Lesotho. In 1992, she took a position as a lecturer at Rhodes University. The National Research Foundation gave her a high rating and helped Nyokong obtain a research laboratory at the university. Soon, she moved from lecturer to professor, and then distinguished professor. She is known for her research in nanotechnology, as well as her work on photo-dynamic therapy.  Her pioneering research in the latter is paving the way for a safer cancer detection and treatment, without the debilitating side effects of chemotherapy.

Nyokong published an open letter that she wrote nominally aimed at her 18-year-old self (who would have been working hard to complete a three-year science course in  courage as her family may not realise the opportunities ahead. It finishes with "You believe you can be a wife and a mother and still be a breadwinner and contribute to society. And you will."

In 2014 she was a professor at Rhodes University in Grahamstown. She was the subject for a photographic portrait for Adrian Steirn's "21 icons". which imagined her returned to her childhood role as a shepherd but now the shepherd is an adult and she is wearing her chemist's white coat. Copies of the picture were sold for charity.

Academic qualifications

PhD    Chemistry, The University of Western Ontario, London, Ontario, Canada, 1987.
  
MSc    Chemistry, McMaster University, Hamilton, Ontario, Canada, 1981.

MSc and PhD studies funded by the Canadian International Development Agency (CIDA).
BSc funded by the Lesotho Government

Appointments and experience

  Distinguished Professor of Chemistry
  Director of the DST/Mintek  Nanotechnology Innovation Centre – Sensors
  Holder of Research Chair Medicinal Chemistry and Nanotechnology – awarded by DST/NRF
  Adjunct professor of chemistry at University of Tromsø in Norway – from 2008
  Professor of Physical-Inorganic Chemistry, Rhodes University, 2001–2006
  Associate Professor of Physical-Inorganic Chemistry, Rhodes University, 19982000
  Lecturer/Senior Lecturer in Chemistry, Rhodes University, 1992–1997.
  Lecturer/Senior Lecturer in Physical-Inorganic Chemistry, University of Lesotho, 1981, 19871991.
  Teaching Assistant, McMaster University, 19791980, and The University of Western Ontario, 19821986.

Recognition and awards

 National Research Foundation "Lifetime Achievement Award", 2013
 National Research Foundation Rating: A
 ISE Electrochemistry Excellence Award: Teaching & Research, 2013
 South African Chemical Institute (SACI) Gold Medal award, 2012
 Included in the National Center for Research on Human Evolution (CENIEH), located in Burgos, Spain to be one of their "13 NAMES TO CHANGE THE WORLD", 2012
 Distinguished professorship at Rhodes University, 2012
 Royal Society in Chemistry (RSC)/Pan Africa Chemistry Network (PACN) Distinguished Women in Chemistry: 2011
 Invited by Irina Bokova, Director-General of UNESCO, to be a member of the UNESCO High-level panel on Science, Technology and Innovation for sustainable Development, June 2011
 International Conference on Frontiers of Polymers and Advanced Materiel (ICFPAM) award in memory of the centenary of the first Nobel Prize in Chemistry awarded to a woman: Marie Curie. And also this is the year of Chemistry, 26th May 2011
 Inducted by Vodacom Lesotho into the Lesotho Hall of Fame, 2010
 Doctor of Science Honoris Causa by Walter Sizulu University, 3rd May, 2010
 Doctor of Science Honoris Causa by University of South Africa, 11th May, 2010
 Fellow of Third World Academy of Science, 2009
 NRF President’s award as Champion for the transformation in research, 2009
 Celebrating Excellence in Organizations (CEO) Most Influential Women in Business and Government (MIW) – Education and Teaching Sector, 20092010 
 L’Oreal-UNESCO award for “Women in Science” as a Laureate representing Africa and the Arab States, 2009
 Committee chaired by Prof A Zawail (Recipient of Nobel prize in Chemistry, 1999)
 Committee C. de Duve, recipient of Nobel prize in Medicine, 1974
 September, 2009, a motion was passed in the National Assembly acknowledging her role in transformation of science in South Africa. Subsequently she addressed the Parliament Portfolio Committee on Science
 Top Three Publishing Scientists in South Africa, 2007
 City Press / Rapport Prestige Awards for Inspirational Women Achievers, 2008
 Research chair for Medicinal Chemistry and Nanotechnology by the Department of Science and Technology and the National Research Foundation, starting 2007
 Order of Mapungubwe: Bronze by the State President Mbeki, 2005
 Grant-Holder medal for 2005 from CSIR for being the best NLC grant holder of the year 2005
 Rhodes University Rhodes Women of the Year in the Senior Research category, 2006
 SABC2/Shorprite-Checkers Woman of the year in Science and Technology, 2004
 Runner-up- DST Women in Science, 2004 and 2008
 Selected by Department of Science and Technology to present the Frances Ames Lecture, 2004
 Vice-Chancellor’s Distinguished Senior Research award, 2003
 Fellow of the Royal Society of South Africa (FRSSA)
 Member of the Academy of Science of South Africa.
 Fulbright Award, 1990. Visited the Radiation Laboratory, University of Notre Dame, Indiana, USA.
 Financial Mail little black book list for two years (2006, 2007, 2008, 2009) for top 100 influential people in South Africa.

Editorship/membership to editorial boards

 Editor: African Journal of Pure and Applied Chemistry.
 South African Representative: Society of Porphyrins and Phthalocyanines based in France.
 Global Journal of Physical Chemistry – Editorial Board member
 Journal of Spectroscopy& Dynamics – Editorial Board member
 International Journal of Electrochemical Science – Editorial Board member
 Advanced Materials Letters – Editorial Board member
 Guest editor: Special Issue for International Journal of Photoenergy (2011) Special Issue on Photomedicine and Photo Nanosystems
 Guest Editor: International Journal of Electrochemistry: Special Issue "Surface Electrochemistry: Structured Electrode, Synthesis, and Characterization"
 Evaluation of French projects : Agence Nationale de la Recherche
 Evaluation of Belgian projects : Research Foundation Flanders
  Evaluation of Czech Republic research foundation projects

Mentorships

Mentoring: Dr Ceril Jones, of Savannah State University, 
Project Title: Thermodynamic Characterization of Phthalocyanines for Photodynamic Therapy.
National Institute of Health (NIH) funding.

Advisory roles

1.    Invited to assist in the selection of the associate professor of chemistry, University of Venda, Feb., 1997.

2.    A member of the Water Research Commission Steering Committee reviewing the University of the Western Cape Project on Desalination and Disinfection of Water, 19982001

3.    A member of the Foundation for Research Development (FRD) panel for monitoring FRD/Industry programs at Port Elizabeth Technikon, 1998.
 
4.    A member of the advisory board: International Conference and exhibition on Integrated Environmental Management in South Africa, held Feb. 1998. This conference was a joint effort between Germany and South Africa.

5.    A member of the Advisory Board: Southern and Eastern Africa Network of Analytical Chemists (SEANAC) conference. Gaborone, Botswana, 710 July 2003 and 1518 July 2007.

6.    A member of the South SOUTH AFRICAN REFERENCE GROUP ON WOMEN IN SCIENCE AND TECHNOLOGY, a group under the Department of Science and Technology −2003.
7.    Appointed by the Minister of Science and Technology to be a member of the panel to select members of council for the South African Council for Natural Scientific Professions (April, 2004).

8.    A member of the advisory Board for the XVIII International Symposium on Bioelectrochemistry and Bioenergetics, 1924 June 2005, Coimbra, Portugal.

9.    A member of the advisory Board: The World Association of Laser Therapy 2008 Conference, 1922 October 2008, Sun City, South Africa.

10.    Invited to review candidates for 2010 Reaxys PhD Prize- Post-doctoral fellows from UK, Belgium, Spain, France and the UK.

11.    Advisory board of South African Chemical Institute (SACI) 2011 CONVENTION, 1621 January 2011, University of Witwatersrand, Johannesburg.

References

External links 

Tebello Nyokong Rhodes researcher profile

South African women chemists
South African chemists
South African scientists
South African women scientists
1951 births
Alternative cancer treatment advocates
L'Oréal-UNESCO Awards for Women in Science laureates
Members of the Academy of Science of South Africa
Fellows of the African Academy of Sciences
Academic staff of Rhodes University
University of Western Ontario alumni
McMaster University alumni
Shepherds
Living people
21st-century women scientists